Jaluit Airport is a public use airstrip located one nautical mile (1.85 km) southwest of the village of Jabor on Jaluit Atoll, Marshall Islands. This airstrip is assigned the location identifier N55 by the FAA and UIT by the IATA.

Facilities 
Jaluit Airport is at an elevation of 4 feet (1.2 m) above mean sea level. The runway is designated 03/21 with a gravel surface measuring 5,000 by 60 feet (1,524 x 18 m). There are no aircraft based at Jaluit.

Airlines and destinations

References

External links 
AirNav airport information for N55

Airports in the Marshall Islands
Airport